Prashant Gupta (born 23 June 1988) is an Indian first-class cricketer who plays for Uttar Pradesh. He made his first-class debut for Uttar Pradesh in the Ranji Trophy Superleague phase on 18 November 2008. He made his List A debut for Uttar Pradesh in the Vijay Hazare Trophy on 14 February 2013. He made his Twenty20 debut for Uttar Pradesh in the Syed Mushtaq Ali Trophy on 24 October 2011. He retired from Indian first class setup in 2019 to ply his trade in overseas leagues . He was drafted in by Deccan Gladiators in 2019 in the Abu Dhabi T10 League . He also featured in the 2021 edition for Deccan Gladiators under Kieron Pollard's captaincy .

References

External links
 

1988 births
Living people
Indian cricketers
Uttar Pradesh cricketers
Sportspeople from Kanpur